The Apostolic Vicariate of Anhalt was a Roman Catholic Latin missionary circonscription in northern Germany, with see in Anhalt.

History 
It was established in 1836 as an apostolic vicariate (exempt, i.e. directly subject to the Holy See, not part of any ecclesiastical province; entitled to a titular bishop) on territory split off from the Apostolic Vicariate of the Nordic Missions.

It was suppressed on 1 March 1921, when its territory passed to the Roman Catholic Diocese of Paderborn, whose Bishop (later Archbishop, as his see was promoted Archdiocese) had been appointed Anhalt's last Apostolic Vicar on 19 June 1920.

Episcopal ordinaries 
(incomplete)
...

 Kaspar Klein (1920.06.19 – 1921.03.01), already Bishop of Paderborn (later Archbishop)

See also 
 Roman Catholicism in Germany

Source and External links 
 GigaCatholic with incumbent biography links

1921 disestablishments in Germany
1836 establishments in Germany
Apostolic vicariates
Former Roman Catholic dioceses in Europe